Cristian Cabrerizo (born January 21, 1993), better known by his stage name Cris Cab is an American singer-songwriter. Cab has released a number of EPs, and has become well known with his 2013 international hit "Liar Liar", produced and written by Pharrell Williams. He was signed to Island Def Jam Records and Island Records. His songs are a fusion of pop, reggae, and soul.

Career
Cris Cab started music at a very young age. Born to Cuban parents in Miami, Florida, he spent summers in The Bahamas broadening his music tastes. At 14, his father bought him his first studio session. At 15, his early demos caught the attention of Pharrell Williams who met him and mentored him. Hugely popular online, articles appeared about him on blogs including Perez Hilton, Just Jared and online website of Billboard. Cris Cab also opened for various acts including T-Pain, Matisyahu, Rebelution, Gym Class Heroes and O.A.R.

Signing a management deal, he released his debut Foreword EP in 2011 and his original single "Good Girls". Wyclef Jean met him on tour and became a second mentor to him and recorded "She's So Fly" with him.

In 2012 Cris Cab released a full-length mixtape, Echo Boom featuring production and collaboration by Pharrell Williams, Mavado, Wyclef Jean, Melanie Fiona, Shaggy, Daytona, Marc Roberge (of O.A.R.) and was signed to Mercury Records. His single "Good Girls (Don't Grow on Trees)" was written by Pharrell Williams and produced by Wyclef Jean, and features a rap section by Big Sean. His song "Paradise (On Earth)" was featured on the NBA 2K14 soundtrack.

His international fame came with "Liar, Liar" released on Island Def Jam Records that has charted in Germany, France, Netherlands and Belgium. The release was accompanied by a music video with cameo appearances by Pharrell Williams.

His full-length album Where I Belong was released on April 7, 2014 in Europe, and is to be released on May 21 in the United Kingdom. A United States full-length release is due this summer.

In October 2014, he was picked as Elvis Duran's Artist of the Month and was featured on NBC's Today show hosted by Kathy Lee Gifford and Hoda Kotb, where he performed live his single "Liar Liar".

In 2015, he released the song "Englishman In New York", originally performed by Sting, and reached as high as number 13 on the France Top 40 chart.

Cab returned to music in 2017 with "All of the Girls" featuring Pitbull.

In 2018, Cab released "Laurent Perrier", a song featuring Latin artist Farruko. He performed the song at the official FIFA World Cup viewing event in Berlin, Germany prior to the country's final game in the tournament.  As a follow-up, Cab released the single "Just Wanna Love You" featuring, J Balvin. At the time of its release (September 2018), Balvin was the #2 ranked artist in the world streaming on Spotify, behind Drake.

Discography

Albums

EPs

Mixtapes

Other releases
 2012: Cris Cab - Live... In the Moment, (recorded at the Grand Central, Miami)

Singles

*Did not appear in the official Belgian Ultratop 50 charts, but rather in the bubbling under Ultratip charts. For Ultratip peaks, added 50 positions to arrive at an equivalent Ultratop position

Others 
2011: "Good Girls"
2012: "Face to Face"
2012: "Echo Boom", (feat. Pharrell Williams)
2012: "She's So Fly" (feat. Wyclef Jean)
2012: "White Lingerie"
2013: "When We Were Young"
2013: "Another Love", (feat. Wyclef Jean)
2013: "Colors", (feat. Mike Posner)
2013: "Paradise (On Earth)"
2014: "Loves Me Not"
2017: "Together"
2017: "Rest of My Life"
2018: "Laurent Perrier" (feat. Farruko & Kore)
2020: "Your Love" (feat. Irina Rimes )

Featured in

References

External links
Official website 
Facebook
Twitter
VEVO YouTube page
 SoundCloud

Living people
Musicians from Miami
American musicians of Cuban descent
1993 births
Writers from Miami
Songwriters from Florida
21st-century American male singers
21st-century American singers
American male songwriters